CAPEX, also known as the Kerala State Cashew Workers Apex Industrial Co-operative Society, is an organization managed by the government of Kerala to promote the cashew industry and especially the export market for cashews.

History
The organization was founded in 1984.
The headquarters of CAPEX is situated at Kollam.

Organization
Part of the organization's mission is to provide the maximum number of workdays to cashew workers as a government employment assistance program.

In 1996–1997 the organization managed ten factories and employed 6000 staff.

References

External links
 
 Central government of India's cashew organization

1984 establishments in Kerala
Agriculture in Kerala
Cooperatives in Kerala
Cashew production in India